The Admiralty, &c. Acts Repeal Act 1865 (28 & 29 Vict c 112) was an Act of the Parliament of the United Kingdom.

Section 20 of the Naval Stores Act 1867 (30 & 31 Vict c 19) provided that the repeal by this Act of sections 1, 2, 4, 5 and 8 of 9 & 10 Will 3 c 41, was thereby repealed as far as those sections related to any stores except naval or victualling stores, or other stores belonging to or under the charge or control of the Admiralty, or to Scotland or Ireland, and that to that extent those sections were thereby revived; but that nothing therein contained was to interfere with the operation of any other Act of the session 30 & 31 Vict.

This Act was repealed by the Statute Law Revision Act 1950.

This Act was repealed for the Republic of Ireland by sections 2(1) and 3(1) of, and Part 4 of Schedule 2 to, the Statute Law Revision Act 2007.

References
George Kettilby Rickards. The Statutes of the United Kingdom of Great Britain and Ireland. Volume 27. Part I. Eyre and Spottiswoode. London. 1865. Pages 178 et seq. Digitized copy from Google Books.
A Collection of the Public General Statutes passed in the Twenty-eighth and Twenty-ninth Years of the Reign of Her Majesty Queen Victoria. Eyre and Spottiswoode. London. 1865. Pages 525 et seq. Digitized copy from Google Books.
A Compendious Abstract of the Public General Acts of the United Kingdom of Great Britain and Northern Ireland, 28 & 29 Victoriae, 1865. Volume 43. From volume 34 of the new series of the Law Journal Reports. Pages 224 et seq. Digitized copy from Google Books.
Paterson, William. The Practical Statutes of the Session 1865. Horace Cox. London. 1865. Pages 270 et seq. Digitized copy from Google Books.

External links
List of amendments and repeals in the Republic of Ireland from the Irish Statute Book.

United Kingdom Acts of Parliament 1865